The 5th Trampoline World Championships were held in Amersfoort, Netherlands on 30 November 1968.

Results

Men

Trampoline

Trampoline Synchro

Women

Trampoline

Trampoline Synchro

References
 Trampoline UK

1968
International gymnastics competitions hosted by the Netherlands
1968 in Dutch sport
1968 in gymnastics
Sports competitions in Amersfoort